The 13th Note Café is a restaurant, bar and music venue in Glasgow, Scotland.

From its beginnings on Glassford Street (what is now Bar Bacchus), the 13th Note moved to its present site on King Street in 1997. A few years later, the 13th Note franchise expanded to include a larger club venue on Clyde Street. The holding company that owned both venues went into receivership in November 2001. In the summer of 2002, The 13th Note Club was bought over by the Channelfly Group (owners of the Barfly franchise), leaving only the café venue still open under the original 13th Note name.

The venues of the 13th Note have hosted concerts by a number of notable acts, including Idlewild, Belle & Sebastian and Franz Ferdinand.

The basement of the original location in was iconic in the Glasgow Indie scene.  Hosting many club nights: an example is The Kazoo Club was launched by Jim Byrne (Dexter Slim and the Pickups). Solo performers and bands could come along and play no matter their experience. There was no charge for entry. Alex Kapranos was one of the first performers. On the opening night everyone who came along was given a kazoo. Local artists drew in charcoal on paper pinned to the walls behind the musicians as they played. The venture was a big success and the owners introduced an entry fee. Alex Kapranos took over the running of the club night. Prior to forming Franz Ferdinand, Alex Kapranos was the music programmer at the venue, hosting the Kazoo Club and 99p Club. The current music programmer is Brendan O'Hare.

References

External links
 13th Note Official Website

Music venues in Glasgow